Cedarbluff (or Cedar Bluff) is an unincorporated community in Clay County, Mississippi, United States. It is located in south central Clay County along Mississippi Highway 50.

History
Cedarbluff is located on the former Southern Railway. Cedarbluff was formerly home to a school and two churches.

A post office operated under the name Cedar Bluff from 1847 to 1895 and began operating under the name Cedarbluff in 1895.

In 1915 an unnamed black man was lynched in Cedarbluff for allegedly entering the room of a white woman. In 1916, an African-American man, Jeff Brown was lynched by a mob "for accidentally bumping into a white girl as he ran to catch a train." Pictures of his lynching were sold to white citizens for five cents each and were used to intimidate African-Americans in the region.
In 1920, a destructive  tornado struck Cedarbluff directly causing major damage.

References

Unincorporated communities in Clay County, Mississippi
Unincorporated communities in Mississippi
Lynching deaths in Mississippi